James Henry Gladmon  (1863–1890) was a Major League Baseball third baseman.

External links

1863 births
1890 deaths
Philadelphia Quakers players
Washington Nationals (AA) players
Washington Nationals (1886–1889) players
Major League Baseball third basemen
Syracuse Stars (minor league baseball) players
Washington Nationals (minor league) players
19th-century baseball players
People from Washington, D.C.